Knocknahunshin, is a townland in County Fermanagh, Northern Ireland. It is in the civil parish of Boho, in between the townlands of Glenkeel and Reyfad. Within this area are the sub-townlands of Arduagh, Carricknamulloge, Carricknine, Horse Rock, Legloughra, Owneyglas, Silkins and Sterrickinard.

This area is mentioned as far back as 1672 as "K:nahinshina" in the Barony of Magheraboy. Later on, in 1834, it was referred to by its Irish name of Cnoc na h-Uinnsean meaning "ridge of the ash trees".

See also 
 List of townlands in County Fermanagh

References 

Townlands of County Fermanagh